The 2022 season was the Baltimore Ravens' 27th in the National Football League (NFL) and their 15th under head coach John Harbaugh. They improved on their 8–9 record from the previous season and qualified for the postseason after missing the playoffs the previous season. The Ravens faced the Cincinnati Bengals in the Wild Card round, losing 24–17. 

The Ravens' three preseason victories extended their preseason winning streak to 23 games, which is an NFL record. The Ravens also held double-digit leads in their first 10 games of the season (they would have only three after that). However, this was also the first season in franchise history that the Ravens went the entire season without scoring a defensive touchdown.  

Injuries on offense again plagued the Ravens for the second straight year, despite it resulting in a playoff appearance. RBs Gus Edwards and J.K. Dobbins missed time during the season and WRs Rashod Bateman and Devin Duvernay sustained a season-ending injury in Week 8. QB Lamar Jackson also suffered a knee injury in Week 13. Although it was initially expected to be a short-term injury, he missed the rest of the season. The offense was severely hampered with backup Tyler Huntley under center and Ravens did not score more than 17 points in any game he started, although Huntley was selected to the Pro Bowl as an injury replacement. The Ravens also had trouble closing out games; they blew four games where they led by at least ten points, including three in the first six weeks of the season; two of which were by 17 or more points. The loss of Lamar Jackson was a major reason the Ravens won only one more time after starting 9–4.

Offseason

Players added

Players lost

Draft

Draft trades

Undrafted free agents

Trades

Staff

Coaching changes

Final roster

Preseason
The Ravens' preseason opponents and schedule were announced in the spring.

Regular season

Schedule

Note: Intra-division opponents are in bold text.

Game summaries

Week 1: Baltimore Ravens 24, New York Jets 9

After a somewhat slow start, the Ravens outscored the Jets, who were led by former Ravens QB Joe Flacco, 21–3 in the 2nd and 3rd quarters enroute to a 24–9 season opening victory. Lamar Jackson threw for 213 yards, three touchdowns, and an interception; the first two touchdowns went to Devin Duvernay while the third one was caught by Rashod Bateman. With the win, the Ravens started the season 1–0 and snapped a six game losing streak which dated back to Week 12 of the previous season.

Week 2: Miami Dolphins 42, Baltimore Ravens 38

Despite leading 35–14 heading into the fourth quarter, the Dolphins outscored the Ravens 28–3 in the fourth quarter, allowing a go-ahead touchdown with 14 seconds left in the game, making the final score 42–38. Jackson threw for 318 yards, three touchdowns, and rushed for 119 yards and a touchdown and surpassed Michael Vick for the most 100-yard rushing games by a quarterback with his 79-yard touchdown run in the third quarter in a losing effort. With the loss, the Ravens dropped to 1–1 and lost their second straight game against the Dolphins.

Week 3: Baltimore Ravens 37, New England Patriots 26

This was the Ravens' first regular season road win in Foxborough, and their first road win against the Patriots since the 2012 AFC Championship Game.

Week 4: Buffalo Bills 23, Baltimore Ravens 20

The Ravens blew a 20–3 lead and lost to Josh Allen and the Bills, 23–20, on a 21-yard field goal by Tyler Bass. With the loss, the Ravens fell to an even 2–2.

Week 5: Baltimore Ravens 19, Cincinnati Bengals 17

The Ravens survived another comeback bid as Justin Tucker kicked the game-winning 43-yard field goal as time expired in a 19–17 win over the Bengals. With the win, the Ravens snapped a six-game home losing streak, improved to 3–2, and moved into first place in the AFC North.

Week 6: New York Giants 24, Baltimore Ravens 20

The Ravens blew their third double-digit lead in five games, losing to the Giants 20–24 following two Lamar Jackson turnovers in the final three minutes of the game. It was Jackson's first loss against an NFC opponent as the Ravens fell to 3–3.

Week 7: Baltimore Ravens 23, Cleveland Browns 20

The Ravens held off the Browns and remained atop the AFC North with a 23–20 home win. Ravens RB Gus Edwards scored two rushing touchdowns in his first game back from injury since the 2020 postseason and LB Malik Harrison blocked a potential game-tying 60-yard field goal by Cade York in the final two minutes of regulation. With the win, the Ravens improved to 4–3.

Week 8: Baltimore Ravens 27, Tampa Bay Buccaneers 22

Week 9: Baltimore Ravens 27, New Orleans Saints 13

Week 11: Baltimore Ravens 13, Carolina Panthers 3

Week 12: Jacksonville Jaguars 28, Baltimore Ravens 27

After winning 3 consecutive games in a row, the Baltimore Ravens headed to Jacksonville to get their 4th consecutive win. However, after having a slight lead, the Ravens collapsed entirely, allowing a Jaguars comeback drive that ended with a Marvin Jones Jr. touchdown and a Zay Jones 2-point conversion to give the Jaguars the lead. Justin Tucker attempted a potential game-winning 67-yard field goal at the end of the game, which would've broken his own record for the longest NFL field goal made, but the kick fell short, and the Jaguars won.

Week 13: Baltimore Ravens 10, Denver Broncos 9

After trailing for almost the entire game, mostly due to an injury to Lamar Jackson, the Ravens capped a 91-yard drive with a game-winning touchdown from Tyler Huntley with 28 seconds to go. The win brings the Ravens to 8–4, matching their win total from last year. It was the last game Jackson would ever play as a Raven.

Week 14: Baltimore Ravens 16, Pittsburgh Steelers 14

Week 15: Cleveland Browns 13, Baltimore Ravens 3

The second game of the Saturday Night Tripleheader, the Ravens went on the road against the Cleveland Browns. The first quarter started 0–0, but after an exchange of field goals, the score became 6–3, Browns. During the 3rd Quarter, Deshaun Watson threw a touchdown to Donovan Peoples-Jones which turned the score to 13–3. This was the final score of the game. After the loss, the Baltimore Ravens lost 1st place in the division because the Cincinnati Bengals beat the Tampa Bay Buccaneers.

Week 16: Baltimore Ravens 17, Atlanta Falcons 9

Week 17: Pittsburgh Steelers 16, Baltimore Ravens 13

Week 18: Cincinnati Bengals 27, Baltimore Ravens 16

Standings

Division

Conference

Postseason

Schedule

Game summaries

AFC Wild Card Playoffs: at (3) Cincinnati Bengals

Individual awards

References

External links
 

Baltimore
Baltimore Ravens seasons
Baltimore Ravens
2020s in Baltimore